The list of marquisates in Norway contains two titles:

 Marquis of Lista (created in 1709)
 Marquis of Mandal (created in 1710)

Danish nobility
Norwegian nobility
 
Marquisates